Frank Dusy (December 17, 1837 – November 9, 1898) was an early business leader of Selma, California and a co-inventor of the Fresno Scraper, the basis of most modern earth-moving machinery. On June 16, 1885, Dusy and his partner Abijah McCall were issued U.S. Patent 320,055, for their improvement on the Buck Scraper, invented by James Porteous of Fresno, California. Porteous, originally a wagon builder, purchased their patent and one held by William Deidrick as he perfected his machine. Dusy was also among the original investors in the Fresno Republican newspaper, which was eventually acquired by and combined with the Fresno Bee.

External links

 

1837 births
1898 deaths
19th-century American inventors
American manufacturing businesspeople
People from Selma, California
19th-century American businesspeople